Frjeda Blanchard, née Cobb (October 2, 1889 – August 29, 1977), was an American plant and animal geneticist, the first to demonstrate Mendelian inheritance in reptiles.

Life and work
Frjeda Blanchard was born on October 2, 1889, in Sydney, Australia, daughter of the plant pathologist and nematologist, Nathan Cobb. Her family returned to the United States in 1905, first living in Hawaii and then settling in Washington, D.C. Cobb's family helped him in his work and Frjeda aided her father in his laboratory. She went to Radcliffe College for three years before returning home to assist her father in his home laboratory and graduated from the University of Illinois at Urbana–Champaign with a B.S. degree in 1916. After helping her father with his nematode research later that year, Blanchard was offered a position with the University of Michigan's Matthaei Botanical Gardens by its director, Harley Harris Bartlett. She became assistant director three years later and received her Ph.D from the university in 1920, after researching Mendelian inheritance in strains of Oenothera (evening primrose). She married Frank N. Blanchard, a zoologist at the university, in 1922 and they had three children together. The couple collaborated researching garter snakes, Frank focused on life history, while Frjeda concentrated on genetics, being the first scientist to document Mendelian inheritance in reptiles. She died on August 29, 1977, in Ann Arbor, Michigan.

She is in the Blanchard family papers held at the Bentley Historical Archive at the University of Michigan.

Journal articles
Frank N. Blanchard, M. Ruth Gilreath and Frieda Cobb Blanchard. The Eastern Ring-Neck Snake (Diadophis punctatus edwardsii) in Northern Michigan (Reptilia, Serpentes, Colubridae). Journal of Herpetology, Volume 13, Number 4 (November 15, 1979), pp. 377–402. DOI: 10.2307/1563473

Notes

References

External links
Frieda Cobb (Blanchard) (1889-1977) 

1889 births
1977 deaths
University of Michigan alumni
University of Illinois Urbana-Champaign alumni
Radcliffe College alumni
University of Michigan faculty
20th-century American women scientists
American geneticists
American women geneticists
Scientists from Sydney